Guandu Town is a rural town in Liuyang City, Hunan Province, People's Republic of China. It is surrounded by Dahu Town on the north, Yanxi Town on the west, Zhangfang Town on the east, and Yonghe on the south.

History
In 222, under the Eastern Wu (222–280), the county government seat was set up here. At that time, it known as "Juling". Guandu town once served as the administrative centre of former Liuyang county.

Administrative division
The town is divided into five villages and three communities, the following areas: 
 Xinyunshan Community
 Nanyue Community
 Zhushan Community
 Guanyintang Village
 Tianjiao Village
 Binghe Village
 Zhulian Village

Geography
The Daxi River flows through the town north to south.

Mount Dajin is a mountain in the town.

Economy
The principal industries in the area are agriculture and forestry.

Education
Guandu Middle School, and No.4 senior highschool of Liuyang is settled here.

Transportation

Expressway
The Changsha–Liuyang Expressway, from Changsha, running west to east through the town to Jiangxi.

Provincial Highway
The Provincial Highway S309 runs west to east through the town.

Attraction
Guandu Ancient Town is a dominant tourist attraction in the town.

Notable people
 Ouyang Xuan (1283–1358), a Yuan dynasty (1271–1368) historian and writer.
 Kong Shiquan (1909–2002), a lieutenant general in the Chinese People's Liberation Army.

References

Divisions of Liuyang
Liuyang